Borys Yakovych Bespalyi (25 May 1953 – 17 October 2022) was a Ukrainian engineer and politician. A member of the People's Democratic Party and later Our Ukraine, he served in the Verkhovna Rada from 1998 to 2007.

Bespalyi died on 17 October 2022, at the age of 69.

References

1953 births
2022 deaths
People's Democratic Party (Ukraine) politicians
Our Ukraine (political party) politicians
People from Irpin
Third convocation members of the Verkhovna Rada
Fourth convocation members of the Verkhovna Rada
Fifth convocation members of the Verkhovna Rada
Recipients of the Order of Merit (Ukraine), 3rd class